The Ninglikfak River flows into Hooper Bay in the Yukon-Kuskokwim River Delta.  The city of Chevak, Alaska is located on this river.

References

See also
List of Alaska rivers

Rivers of Alaska
Rivers of Kusilvak Census Area, Alaska
Rivers of Unorganized Borough, Alaska